Bittle is a surname. Notable people with the surname include:

Chris Bittle (born 1979), Canadian politician
Jerry Bittle (1949–2003), American cartoonist
R. Harry Bittle (born 1938), American politician
Ryan Bittle (born 1976), American actor